Israel Scheffler (November 25, 1923 – February 16, 2014) was an American philosopher of science and of education.

Career
Scheffler held B.A. and M.A. degrees in psychology from Brooklyn College, an M.H.L. and a D.H.L.(hon.) from the Jewish Theological Seminary of America. He defended his doctoral thesis, On Quotation, at the University of Pennsylvania in 1952, where he studied with Nelson Goodman and began teaching that year at Harvard University, where he spent his career. He retired in 1992.
His main interests lay in the philosophical interpretation of language, symbolism, science and education. He was a Fellow of the American Academy of Arts and Sciences, a founding member of the National Academy of Education and a past president of both the Philosophy of Science Association and the Charles S. Peirce Society.

Publications
His works have been translated from English into French, German, Italian, Spanish, Hebrew, Chinese, Japanese, Korean, and Persian.

Books
Scheffler, Israel. The Anatomy of Inquiry; Philosophical Studies in the Theory of Science. New York: Knopf, 1963. OCLC 526705
Scheffler, Israel. Philosophy and Education: Modern Readings. Boston: Allyn and Bacon, 1966. OCLC 397699249
Scheffler, Israel. Science and Subjectivity. Indianapolis: Bobbs-Merrill, 1967. OCLC 374512
Scheffler, Israel. Conditions of Knowledge: An Introduction to Epistemology and Education. Chicago: University of Chicago Press, 1978., 
Scheffler, Israel. The Language of Education. Springfield: Ill, 1983. 
Scheffler, Israel. Four Pragmatists: A Critical Introduction to Peirce, James, Mead, and Dewey. New York: Humanities Press, 1971. 
Scheffler, Israel, Nelson Goodman, and Richard Rudner. Logic & Art. Indianapolis: Bobbs-Merrill Co, 1972.
Scheffler, Israel. Reason and Teaching. Indianapolis: Bobbs-Merrill, 1973. 
Scheffler, Israel. Conditions of Knowledge. 1978. OCLC 464010934
Scheffler, Israel. Beyond the Letter: A Philosophical Inquiry into Ambiguity, Vagueness, and Metaphor in Language. International library of philosophy and scientific method. London: Routledge & Kegan Paul, 1979. 
Scheffler, Israel. Of Human Potential: An Essay in the Philosophy of Education. Boston: Routledge & Kegan Paul, 1985. 
Scheffler, Israel. Inquiries: Philosophical Studies of Language, Science, & Learning. Indianapolis: Hackett Pub. Co, 1986. 
Scheffler, Israel. In Praise of the Cognitive Emotions and Other Essays in the Philosophy of Education. New York: Routledge, 1991. 9780415903646 (a Collection of articles spanning 1974 to 1990.)
Scheffler, Israel. Symbolic Worlds: Art, Science, Language, Ritual. Cambridge [England]: Cambridge University Press, 1997. 
Scheffler, Israel. Worlds of Truth: A Philosophy of Knowledge. Malden, MA: Wiley-Blackwell, 2009.

Autobiographies
Scheffler, Israel. Teachers of My Youth: An American Jewish Experience. Philosophy and education, v. 5. Dordrecht: Kluwer Academic Publishers, 1995. 
Scheffler, Israel. Gallery of Scholars: A Philosopher's Recollections. Philosophy and education, v. 13. Dordrecht: Kluwer Academic Publishers, 2004.

References

Philosophers of science
20th-century American philosophers
20th-century American Jews
Jewish philosophers
2014 deaths
Philosophers of education
1923 births
Brooklyn College alumni
University of Pennsylvania alumni
21st-century American Jews